Arsen Grigoryan (Armenian: Արսեն Գրիգորյան; born 7 December 1968), is a Syrian-born Armenian traditional songs performer. He was born in 1968 in the city of Qamishli at the northeast of Syria.

Grigoryan moved to Yerevan in 1987 to pursue his studies in the Komitas State Conservatory of Yerevan. Since then, he has lived in Armenia. In 2014, he was awarded with the title of Honored Artist of Armenia.

References

1968 births
Living people
20th-century Armenian male singers
Armenian pop singers
Syrian people of Armenian descent
People from Qamishli